Langhorns is an instrumental surf music band from Lund, Sweden. The members are:
 Michael Sellers - guitar  (Sellars was previously in Swedish band The Sinners)
 Martin Berglund - bass
 Rikard Swardh - drums 
 Erik Wesser - organ 

The band is strongly influenced by surf music and Latin music.

Some of their music has been used on Nickelodeon's cartoon SpongeBob SquarePants and on the TV series Sex and the City. They are also featured in the Swedish horror film Frostbiten.

So far, they've released three albums on Bad Taste Records label:

Langhorns (1998)
Club Gabardino (1999)
Mission Exotica (2003)

External links
 Official website 
 Langhorns page at Bad Taste Records
 Official MySpace page

Surf music groups